is a Japanese long-distance runner. She represented Japan at the 2020 Tokyo Olympics.

Running career

Ichiyama is winner of 2017 Fukuoka International Cross Country (8 km in 26:46) and 2020 Nagoya Women's Marathon in 2:20:29 thus beating 2:21:47 time of Mizuki Matsuda (2020 Osaka International Women's Marathon) to enter as third participant to 2020 Tokyo Olympics, together with Honami Maeda and Ayuko Suzuki. She won 2021 Osaka Women's Marathon with new event record 2:21:11.

Footwear

Mao Ichiyama was sponsored by Adidas. From 2020 Nagoya Women's Marathon she is sponsored by Nike, where she made her Marathon personal best.

International competitions
Key:

References

External links
 
 

Living people
1997 births
Sportspeople from Kagoshima Prefecture
Japanese female long-distance runners
Japanese female cross country runners
Japanese female marathon runners
Olympic female marathon runners
World Athletics Championships athletes for Japan
Japan Championships in Athletics winners
Olympic athletes of Japan
Athletes (track and field) at the 2020 Summer Olympics
20th-century Japanese women
21st-century Japanese women